Silvio Spaccesi  (August 1, 1926 – June 2, 2015) was an Italian actor and voice actor.

Biography
Born in Macerata, Spaccesi studied in a Salesians of Don Bosco School, and made his official theatrical debut with the stage company held by Angelo Perugini. After moving to Rome, he formed at the Silvio d’Amico Academy of Dramatic Arts. He was best known for the musical comedy Forza venite gente, in which he played the role of Pietro di Bernardone, Francis of Assisi's father.

Spaccesi was also active as a voice actor and a dubber. He voiced Yoda in the Italian versions of the Star Wars original trilogy and Santa Claus in The Nightmare Before Christmas. He was also the Italian voice of Orville in the 1977 Disney film The Rescuers and the second voice of Barney Rubble in The Flintstones. Spaccesi often dubbed actors such as Gustav Knuth, Charles Durning, Frank Oz and Jack Warden in a select number of their films.

Death
Spaccesi died in Rome on June 2, 2015, at the age of 88 just a few days after the death of his partner Rosaura Marchi.

Filmography

Cinema
 Adriana Lecouvreur (1955)
 In Prison Awaiting Trial (1972) - Maresciallo
 Aretino's Blue Stories (1972) - Cecco
 Aretino's Stories of the Three Lustful Daughters (1972) - Cecco 
 Come fu che Masuccio Salernitano, fuggendo con le brache in mano, riuscì a conservarlo sano (1972) - Swindler
 They Were Called Three Musketeers But They Were Four (1973) - King Louis XIII
 Il colonnello Buttiglione diventa generale (1974) - General Damigiani
 La minorenne (1974) - The Uncle Priest
 The Immortal Bachelor (1975) - Lawyer
 Café Express (1980) - Giuseppe Sanguigno
 Il carabiniere (1981) - Don Saverio
 Segni particolari: bellissimo (1983) - Priest
 Mezzo destro mezzo sinistro - 2 calciatori senza pallone (1985) - President Beccaceci
 Italians in Rio (1987) - Romolo Cococcia
 Anni 90: Parte II (1993) - Bastiano Ciccone
 Package, Double Package and Counterpackage (1993) - Nicola Settimelli
 Keys in Hand (1996) - Judge

Dubbing roles

Animation
Orville in The Rescuers
Santa Claus in The Nightmare Before Christmas
Barney Rubble in The Flintstones (2nd voice)
Bashful in Snow White and the Seven Dwarfs (1972 redub)
Puggsy in Tom and Jerry: The Movie
Bonan in Dog of Flanders
James Bloggs in When the Wind Blows
Larry in The New Three Stooges

Live action
Yoda in Star Wars: Episode V – The Empire Strikes Back
Yoda in Star Wars: Episode VI – Return of the Jedi
Doc Hopper in The Muppet Movie
Glenn Purcell in Airport 1975
Oren Trask in Working Girl
King of Swamp Castle in Monty Python and the Holy Grail
Ed Traxler in The Terminator
Colonel Erhardt To Be or Not to Be
Mickey Morrissey in The Verdict
Big Ben Healy in Problem Child
Blindman in Young Frankenstein
Mr. Tarkanian in The Great Muppet Caper
Mr. Wing in Gremlins
Mr. Wing / Janitor in Gremlins 2: The New Batch
Ghost of Christmas Present in The Muppet Christmas Carol
Gilbert of Glockenspur in Dragonheart
Gale Snoats in Raising Arizona
James Gordon in Batman
Charles Dreyfus in Revenge of the Pink Panther
Brett in Alien
Sergeant Hulka in Stripes
Uncle Walt in Twilight Zone: The Movie
Hoagy in Pete's Dragon
Jacobs in Alice Doesn't Live Here Anymore
Eli Sands in The Concorde ... Airport '79
Christie in The Quatermass Xperiment
Mr. Emerson in A Room with a View
Frank Alexander in A Clockwork Orange
Saburo Kurusu in Tora! Tora! Tora!
Miracle Max in The Princess Bride
Mr. Mushnik in Little Shop of Horrors
Thomas Davies in Roots

References

External links 

1926 births
2015 deaths
Italian male stage actors
Italian male film actors
Italian male television actors
Italian male voice actors
Italian male radio actors
People from Macerata
20th-century Italian male actors
Accademia Nazionale di Arte Drammatica Silvio D'Amico alumni